José María Queipo de Llano y Ruiz de Saravia, 7th Count of Toreno, GE (25 November 178616 September 1843), was a nineteenth-century Spanish politician and historian, who was Prime Minister of Spain. In Spain he is simply known as Conde de Toreno.

Life
Toreno was born at Oviedo on the November 25, 1786. His family was wealthy and belonged to the most ancient nobility of Asturias. His mother, Dorninga Ruiz de Saravia, owned property in the province of Cuenca. The son received a better education in classics, mathematics and modern languages than was usual at that time. The young viscount of Matarrosa, the title he bore in his fathers lifetime, was introduced to the writings of Voltaire and Rousseau by the abbot of the Benedictine house of Montserrat in Madrid. He was present at Madrid when the city rose against the French occupation led by Marshal Murat on 2 May 1808, and took part in the struggle which was the beginning of the Peninsular War.

From Madrid he escaped to Asturias, and on May 30 he embarked in a Jersey privateer at Gijon, with other delegates, in order to ask for the help of England against the French. The deputation was enthusiastically received in London. By December 30 he was back in Asturias, his father having died in the interval. During the Peninsular War he saw some service in the first occupation of Asturias by the French, but he was mainly occupied by his duties as a member of the Cortes. In 1809 he was at Seville, where one of his uncles was a member of the central Junta. In the following year he was a leader of the party which compelled the Regency to summon the Cortes to which he was elected by Asturias early in 1811 though he was short several months of the legal age of twenty-five. His election was opposed by some of his own relatives who did not share his opinions, but it was ratified by the Cortes.

Toreno was conspicuous among the well-meaning men who framed the liberal and republican constitution of 1812. When the authoritarian King Ferdinand VII returned from prison in France in 1814 Toreno foresaw a reaction, and put himself out of reach of the king. He was the more an object of suspicion because his brother-in-law, Juan Díaz Porlier, perished in a wild attempt to support the constitution by force. Toreno remained in exile till the outbreak of the revolution of 1820. Between that year and 1823 he was in Spain serving in the restored Cortes, and experience had abated his radical ardour. When the French intervened in 1823 Toreno had again to go into exile, and remained abroad till the king published the amnesty of October 15, 1832.

He returned home in July 1833, but remained on his estates till the king's death on September 29. As hereditary standard bearer of Asturias (Alferez Mayor) it fell to him to proclaim the young queen, Isabella II. In 1834 his now moderate opinions pointed him out to the queen regent, Maria Christina, as a useful man for office. In June 1834 he was minister of finance, and became the 2nd Prime Minister of Spain on June 7. His tenure of the premiership lasted only till September 14 of the same year, when the regents attempt to retain a practically despotic government under a thin constitutional veil broke down. The greater part of the remainder of his life was spent in voluntary exile, and he died in Paris on September 16, 1843. Toreno is chiefly remembered as the author of the History of the Rising, War and Revolution of Spain, which he began between 1823 and 1832 and published in 1836–1838 in Paris.
It was one of the earliest and more comprehensive studies of the Peninsular War written by a Spaniard who held a prominent role in those events.

Further reading
Raymond Carr, Spain 1808-1975 (Oxford, 1982)
 José Luis Comellas, 'Las Cortes de Cádiz y la constitución de 1812', Revista de Estudios Politicos 126 (1962), 69-112
 W. Fehrenbach, 'Moderados and Exaltados: the liberal opposition to Ferdinand VII, 1814-1823', Hispanic American Historical Review 50 (1970), 52-69
 Miguel Artola Gallego, La España de Fernando VII (Madrid, 1968)
Jonathan Harris, 'Los escritos de codificación de Jeremy Bentham y su recepción en el primer liberalismo español', Télos. Revista Iberoamericana de Estudios Utilitaristas 8 (1999), 9-29
 Gabriel H. Lovett, Napoleon and the Birth of Modern Spain, 2 vols (New York, 1965)
Sebastian Miñano, Histoire de la révolution d'Espagne de 1820 à 1823, 2 vols. (Paris, 1824)

Notes

References

|-

|-

|-

|-

1786 births
1843 deaths
People from Oviedo
Counts of Toreno
Moderate Party (Spain) politicians
19th-century Spanish politicians
Prime Ministers of Spain
Ambassadors of Spain to the United Kingdom of Great Britain and Ireland
Spanish nobility